Rock Spring Run is a  long 1st order tributary to the Youghiogheny River in Fayette County, Pennsylvania.

Variant names
According to the Geographic Names Information System, it has also been known historically as:
Shermans Run

Course
Rock Spring Run rises about 2.5 miles north-northeast of Victoria, Pennsylvania, and then flows southwest to join the Youghiogheny River at Victoria.

Watershed
Rock Spring Run drains  of area, receives about 47.9 in/year of precipitation, has a wetness index of 381.95, and is about 94% forested.

See also
List of rivers of Pennsylvania

References

Tributaries of the Youghiogheny River
Rivers of Pennsylvania
Rivers of Fayette County, Pennsylvania